Events from the year 2012 in Austria

Incumbents
 President: Heinz Fischer
 Chancellor: Werner Faymann

Governors
 Burgenland: Hans Niessl 
 Carinthia: Gerhard Dörfler 
 Lower Austria: Erwin Pröll 
 Salzburg: Gabi Burgstaller 
 Styria: Franz Voves 
 Tyrol: Günther Platter
 Upper Austria: Josef Pühringer
 Vienna: Michael Häupl 
 Vorarlberg: Markus Wallner

Events
 October 14 – Austrian skydiver Felix Baumgartner becomes the first person to break the sound barrier without any machine assistance during a record space dive out of the Red Bull Stratos helium-filled balloon from 24 miles (39 kilometers) over Roswell, New Mexico in the United States.

Births

 28 January – Princess Antoinette Léopoldine Jeanne Marie

Deaths
 5 April — Ferdinand Alexander Porsche, German car designer (born 1935)

References

 
Years of the 21st century in Austria
Austria
Austria
2010s in Austria